The 2012 Royal Indian Open was a tournament organized for female professional tennis players, played on outdoor hard courts. The event is classified as a WTA Challenger Series tournament. It took place in Pune, India between 5 and 11 November 2012.

WTA entrants

Seeds

 1 Rankings are as of 29 October 2012.

Other entrants
The following players received wildcards into the singles main draw:
  Prerna Bhambri
  Rutuja Bhosale
  Andrea Petkovic
  Prarthana Thombare

The following players received entry from the qualifying draw:
  Stephanie Bengson
  Nidhi Chilumula
  Andreja Klepač
  Rishika Sunkara

Champions

Singles

 Elina Svitolina def.  Kimiko Date-Krumm, 6–2, 6–3

Doubles

 Nina Bratchikova /  Oksana Kalashnikova def.  Julia Glushko /  Noppawan Lertcheewakarn, 6–0, 4–6, [10–8]

References

External links
 Official website

Royal Indian Open
Royal Open
Royal Indian Open
2012 in Indian women's sport